Gopinathpur is a small village in Tarasingi, Ganjam district, Odisha, India.  the 2011 Census of India, it had a population of 374 across 83 households.

References 

Villages in Ganjam district